John Mars, known as 2 Black 2 Strong, is an American rapper who recorded in the early 1990s.  He is perhaps best known for his song "Burn Baby Burn," about the right to burn the American flag.  He led a crew of rappers, MMG (Militant Manhattan Gangsters or Mighty Motherfuckin’ Gangsters), which appeared on many of his tracks.

Early life
2 Black 2 Strong is the professional name of John Mars.  He grew up in Harlem.

Burn Baby Burn EP
"Burn Baby Burn," recorded in 1990, features a guest verse from Chuck D.  The song, about the right to burn the American flag, was controversial.  A pressing plant, Sonopress, refused to press it, and Musicland and Sam Goody refused to carry it.  The song was released on an EP of the same name by In Effect/Clappers.  Robert Christgau, in The Village Voice, gave it an honorable mention rating, specifically highlighting "Burn Baby Burn." Gregory Lee Johnson, an activist who had a flag-burning conviction overturned by the Supreme Court of the United States, introduces the song.

Doin' Hard Time on Planet Earth
2 Black 2 Strong, backed by MMG, released his debut album in 1991, on Relativity Records. Doin' Hard Time on Planet Earth received positive reviews from critics. Alex Henderson, in AllMusic, gave it a 4-star rating (out of 5), and called it "one of the strongest -- and most unjustly neglected -- rap releases of 1991 ... a riveting, gutsy work that makes its share of highly valid points when addressing social and political issues." Henderson went on to write that "unfortunately, as the '90s progressed, 2 Black 2 Strong remained undeservedly obscure." Christgau also praised the album, awarding it a B+ grade, and writing: "The music of this Harlem crew is loud beats anchored to spare guitar, the hip hop obverse of death metal if death metal didn't always strain for drama ... Without reveling in brutality for its own sake, they state the amoral facts as they understand them--or misunderstand them, if it makes any difference." One track, "War on Drugs," addresses the possibility of the federal government's role in the crack epidemic.

Discography
Burn Baby Burn EP, In Effect/Clappers, 1990
Doin' Hard Time on Planet Earth, Relativity/Clappers, 1991

References

Notes

Citations

Bibliography

African-American male rappers
Rappers from New York (state)
20th-century American rappers
Living people
Relativity Records artists
Year of birth missing (living people)
20th-century American male musicians
20th-century African-American musicians
21st-century African-American people